Danbury Place was an English country house, first built by Walter Mildmay in the time of Elizabeth I, dated to 1589. It is situated on one of the highest points of the county of Essex.

The house was demolished and rebuilt on an adjoining site around 1830, completed as a red brick mansion in 1832. It then became an episcopal palace, as Danbury Palace, in 1845, a use that continued until 1890.

History
Danbury Place was in the Mildmay family until 1673, when John Mildmay died childless. His wife Mary then married Robert Corey, Archdeacon of Middlesex. She died in 1724; of the Corey children, only Elizabeth, who married William Fytche, survived to inherit, and Danbury Place passed to the Fytche family.

In the next generation, Danbury Place passed in 1750 to William's younger son Thomas Fytche (1706–1777). He had work done on the house by Isaac Ware, who installed a chimney piece. He died without issue, and the house passed to his niece and adopted daughter Elizabeth, daughter of William Fytche who briefly was Governor of Bengal. In 1775 she had married Lewis Disney, who added Fytche to his name. William Huntington mentioned that he once worked there for "Squire Fitch".

Lewis Disney Fytche had five daughters with his wife, who died in 1787. The eldest (Frances) Elizabeth married William Hillary in 1800, who bought out his father-in-law's interest in the house in 1801, and resided there with his young family. He separated from Elizabeth in 1808, going to the Isle of Man to live while she stayed at Danbury Place, until 1823 when her father died. At the time of her own death in 1828 it was let out; Hillary then sold Danbury Place to John Round.

Round resided at Danbury Place, having replaced the old house with a new one designed by Thomas Hopper (1832), in a Tudor Gothic (neo-Elizabethan) style. After 12 years it became an episcopal palace for the Bishop of Rochester, with a change of name to Danbury Palace.

Danbury Palace was put up for sale in 1892, with a park of 284 acres. It was sold to Seth Taylor, who sold it on to Hugh Hoare. At the beginning of World War II, the house and grounds belonged to John Tyson Wigan, who allowed it to be used as a maternity hospital. After the war a large part of the park was bought by Essex County Council. The house and other buildings went to Anglia Polytechnic University in 1974, when the Danbury Country Park was created. The house was registered as a Grade II Listed Building in 1987.

After three decades of use as a conference centre, Danbury Palace was sold by the University (by then Anglia Ruskin). As of 2017 the Palace has been converted into thirteen flats.

The Park
Originally Danbury Palace was set in a deer park. By 1758 there were avenues of trees.

Notes

Houses completed in 1832
Episcopal palaces in England
Danbury, Essex